Christopher Benstead is a British film composer, arranger and Academy-Award winning re-recording mixer. He has worked on several projects with director Guy Ritchie including composing the score for The Gentlemen, starring Matthew McConaughey and Michelle Dockery, and the action thriller Wrath of Man. He also arranged and composed additional music for Guy Ritchie's Aladdin alongside legendary songwriter and composer Alan Menken and produced and arranged the songs in the film, working with Will Smith to create re-imagined versions of the original's songs.

Chris composed additional music for Beauty and the Beast working closely with Alan Menken and director Bill Condon.

Chris received OSCAR and BAFTA awards for his work as re-recording mixer on Alfonso Cuaron’s 2013 film Gravity, starring Sandra Bullock and George Clooney. Chris’ unique skillset allowed him to mix and sculpt the music in an extremely immersive way, pushing the limits of surround sound and exploiting the new ‘Dolby Atmos’ standard.

Chris is a versatile multi-instrumentalist and achieved a First-Class honours in music and sound recording from the University of Surrey. He was also named as Alumni of the year for his ground-breaking achievement in music mixing on ‘Gravity’.

References

External links

Twitter
In Conversation: Spitfire Audio

Year of birth missing (living people)
Living people
Alumni of the University of Surrey
Best Sound Mixing Academy Award winners
Best Sound BAFTA Award winners
Place of birth missing (living people)